The Madison Square Garden Walk of Fame (MSG Walk of Fame) was established in 1992 "to recognize athletes, artists, announcers and coaches for their extraordinary achievements and memorable performances at the venue."  Twenty-five athletes were inducted into the MSG Walk of Fame at its inaugural ceremony in 1992, a black-tie dinner to raise money to fight multiple sclerosis.

MSG Walk of Fame "Firsts" 
Tennis standouts Chris Evert, Billie Jean King and Martina Navratilova were all inducted on the same day in 1993, and were the first female inductees. Other "firsts" in the MSG Walk of Fame include Elton John (1992), first entertainer; Marv Albert (1996), first sportscaster; Rolling Stones (1998), first band;. and Scott Hamilton (1998), first figure skater.

List of Inductees

References 

Madison Square Garden
Awards established in 1992